Kermajan Rural District is a rural district (dehestan) in the Central District of Kangavar County, Kermanshah Province, Iran. At the 2006 census, its population was 6,423, in 1,499 families. The rural district has 16 villages.

References 

Rural Districts of Kermanshah Province
Kangavar County